In the pharynx, the sinus of Morgagni is the enclosed space between the upper border of the superior pharyngeal constrictor muscle, the base of the skull and the pharyngeal aponeurosis.

Contents
Structures passing through this sinus are:
 Cartilaginous part of auditory tube
 Levator veli palatini muscle
 Ascending palatine artery
 Palatine branch of Ascending pharyngeal artery
 Tensor veli palatini muscle

Clinical significance
In nasopharyngeal carcinoma, the tumor may extend laterally
and involve this sinus involving the mandibular nerve. This 
produces a triad of symptoms known as Trotter's Triad.
These symptoms are:
 Conductive deafness (due to Eustachian tube obstruction)
 Ipsilateral immobility of the soft palate
 Trigeminal neuralgia

References

Human head and neck